Sphaeropthalma is a genus of velvet ants (a type of wasp) described by C.A. Blake in 1871 within the family Mutillidae.

Description
Sphaeropthalma are among the smaller velvet ants. Many species have red hair (common to many species in the family), while a few are more pink or white, or black. 
The genus is largely made up of species that are active only at night. Some, however, are active during the day. The ones which have pink hair are nocturnal.

Habitat
Most dry areas, or open areas.

Behavior
Scurries along the ground, in search of solitary wasp nests, which it will parasitize.

Host species
These wasps prefer to lay their eggs in nests of bembicine wasps, e.g. sand wasps and horse guard wasps.

Species

 Sphaeropthalma acontius Fox, 1899
 Sphaeropthalma albopilosa Blake, 1872
 Sphaeropthalma amphion Fox, 1899
 Sphaeropthalma anaspasia Cockerell and Rohwer, 1908
 Sphaeropthalma angulifera Schuster, 1958
 Sphaeropthalma arenicola Schuster, 1958
 Sphaeropthalma arota Cresson, 1875
 Sphaeropthalma auripilis Blake, 1871
 Sphaeropthalma baboquivari Schuster, 1958
 Sphaeropthalma becki Ferguson, 1967
 Sphaeropthalma bellerophon Fox, 1899
 Sphaeropthalma bisetosa Schuster, 1958
 Sphaeropthalma blakeii Fox, 1893
 Sphaeropthalma borealis Schuster, 1958
 Sphaeropthalma boweri Schuster, 1944
 Sphaeropthalma brachyptera Schuster, 1945
 Sphaeropthalma capricornis Rohwer, 1909
 Sphaeropthalma ceres Fox, 1899
 Sphaeropthalma ceyxoides Schuster, 1958
 Sphaeropthalma clara Cresson, 1865
 Sphaeropthalma coaequalis Cameron, 1896
 Sphaeropthalma coloradensis Dalla Torre, 1897
 Sphaeropthalma contrahenda Dalla Torre, 1897
 Sphaeropthalma danaus Blake, 1871
 Sphaeropthalma dentifera Schuster, 1958
 Sphaeropthalma difficilis Baker, 1905
 Sphaeropthalma diomeda Fox, 1899
 Sphaeropthalma dirce Fox, 1899
 Sphaeropthalma ecarinata Schuster, 1958
 Sphaeropthalma edwardsii Cresson, 1875
 Sphaeropthalma erato Blake, 1879
 Sphaeropthalma erigone Fox, 1899
 Sphaeropthalma facilis Cameron, 1896
 Sphaeropthalma ferruginea Blake, 1879
 Sphaeropthalma ferruginopsis Schuster, 1958
 Sphaeropthalma fuscipes Schuster, 1958
 Sphaeropthalma halcyone Fox, 1899
 Sphaeropthalma helicaon Fox, 1899
 Sphaeropthalma hyalina Blake, 1871
 Sphaeropthalma hypermnestra Fox, 1899
 Sphaeropthalma ignacio Schuster, 1958
 Sphaeropthalma imperialiformis Viereck, 1906
 Sphaeropthalma imperialis Blake, 1871
 Sphaeropthalma insignis Baker, 1905
 Sphaeropthalma jacala Schuster, 1958
 Sphaeropthalma juxta Blake, 1872
 Sphaeropthalma laodamia Fox, 1899
 Sphaeropthalma luiseno Schuster, 1958
 Sphaeropthalma macswaini Ferguson, 1967
 Sphaeropthalma marpesia Blake, 1879
 Sphaeropthalma megagnathos Schuster, 1958
 Sphaeropthalma mendica Blake, 1871
 Sphaeropthalma mesillensis Cockerell, 1897
 Sphaeropthalma militaris Schuster, 1958
 Sphaeropthalma minutella Mickel, 1938
 Sphaeropthalma nanula Dalla Torre, 1897
 Sphaeropthalma neomexicana Schuster, 1958
 Sphaeropthalma noctivaga Melander, 1903
 Sphaeropthalma nokomis Blake, 1871
 Sphaeropthalma ordae Schuster, 1958
 Sphaeropthalma orestes Fox, 1899
 Sphaeropthalma pallida Blake, 1871
 Sphaeropthalma pallidipes Schuster, 1958
 Sphaeropthalma papaga Schuster, 1958
 Sphaeropthalma parapenalis Ferguson, 1967
 Sphaeropthalma parkeri Schuster, 1958
 Sphaeropthalma pateli Schuster, 1958
 Sphaeropthalma pensylvanica Lepeletier, 1845
 Sphaeropthalma pervaga Melander, 1903
 Sphaeropthalma pinalea Schuster, 1958
 Sphaeropthalma pinales Schuster, 1958
 Sphaeropthalma pluto Fox, 1899
 Sphaeropthalma reducta Schuster, 1958
 Sphaeropthalma rubriventris Schuster, 1958
 Sphaeropthalma sabino Schuster, 1958
 Sphaeropthalma sanctaefeae Cockerell, 1897
 Sphaeropthalma scudderi Schuster, 1958
 Sphaeropthalma seminanula Rohwer, 1909
 Sphaeropthalma similis Schuster, 1958
 Sphaeropthalma sonora Schuster, 1958
 Sphaeropthalma spinifera Schuster, 1958
 Sphaeropthalma subcarinata Schuster, 1958
 Sphaeropthalma sublobata Schuster, 1958
 Sphaeropthalma tetracuspis Schuster, 1958
 Sphaeropthalma triangularis Blake, 1871
 Sphaeropthalma tuberculifera Schuster, 1958
 Sphaeropthalma uro Blake, 1879
 Sphaeropthalma uvaldella Schuster, 1958
 Sphaeropthalma virguncula Blake, 1886
 Sphaeropthalma yumaella Schuster, 1958
 Sphaeropthalma zenobia Blake, 1879
 Sphaeropthalma zephyritis Fox, 1899

References

Mutillidae
Hymenoptera genera